Karınca Ailesi ve Orman, (1984-1988) channel TRT 1, Turkish cartoon.

Turkish animated television series